The Latin Empire, also referred to as the Latin Empire of Constantinople, was a feudal Crusader state founded by the leaders of the Fourth Crusade on lands captured from the Byzantine Empire. The Latin Empire was intended to replace the Byzantine Empire as the Western-recognized Roman Empire in the east, with a Catholic emperor enthroned in place of the Eastern Orthodox Roman emperors.

The Fourth Crusade had originally been called to retake the Muslim-controlled city of Jerusalem, but a sequence of economic and political events culminated in the Crusader army sacking the city of Constantinople, the capital of the Byzantine Empire. Originally, the plan had been to restore the deposed Byzantine Emperor Isaac II Angelos, who had been usurped by Alexios III Angelos, to the throne. The crusaders had been promised financial and military aid by Isaac's son Alexios IV, with which they had planned to continue to Jerusalem. When the crusaders reached Constantinople the situation quickly turned volatile and while Isaac and Alexios briefly ruled, the crusaders did not receive the payment they had hoped for. In April 1204, they captured and plundered the city's enormous wealth.

The crusaders selected their own emperor from among their own ranks, Baldwin of Flanders, and divided the territory of the Byzantine Empire into various new vassal crusader states. The Latin Empire's authority was immediately challenged by Byzantine rump states led by the Laskaris family (connected to the Angelos dynasty of 1185–1204) in Nicaea and the Komnenos family (which had ruled as Byzantine Emperors 1081–1185) in Trebizond. From 1224 to 1242 the Komnenos Doukas family, also connected to the Angeloi, challenged Latin authority from Thessalonica. The Latin Empire failed to attain political or economic dominance over the other Latin powers that had been established in former Byzantine territories in the wake of the Fourth Crusade, especially Venice, and after a short initial period of military successes it went into a steady decline due to constant war with Bulgaria to the north and the various Byzantine claimants. Eventually, the Nicene Empire recovered Constantinople and restored the Byzantine Empire under Michael VIII Palaiologos in 1261. The last Latin emperor, Baldwin II, went into exile, but the imperial title survived, with several pretenders to it, until the 14th century.

Like the term "Byzantine Empire", "Latin Empire" was not a contemporary term used by the empire itself or the rest of the world. The term Romania ("Land of the Romans") had been used unofficially by the population of the Byzantine Empire for their country for centuries.

Etymology 

Much like the term "Byzantine", which was invented in the 16th century, "Latin Empire" was not a contemporary name used by or for the regime set up by the crusaders of the Fourth Crusade in Constantinople. Instead, both terms were invented much later by historians seeking to differentiate between the classical period of the Roman Empire, the medieval period of the Byzantine Empire, and the late medieval Latin Empire, all of which called themselves "Roman". The term "Latin" has been used by these later historians because the crusaders (Franks, Venetians, and other westerners) were Roman Catholic and used Latin as their liturgical and scholarly language. It is used in contrast to the Eastern Orthodox locals who used Greek in both liturgy and common speech. The Byzantines referred to the Latin Empire as the Frankokratia (Φραγκοκρατία, lit. "rule of the Franks") or the Latinokratia (Λατινοκρατία, lit. "rule of the Latins").

Founding treaties issued by the crusaders specifically refer to the empire as the imperium Constantinopolitanum ("Empire of Constantinople"). Although this is a marked departure from the standard Byzantine nomenclature and ideology (designating the empire as the Basileía Rhōmaíōn, "Empire of the Romans"), imperium Constantinopolitanum was the standard name used for the eastern empire in western sources, such as in papal correspondence, and suggests that the Latin leaders viewed themselves as “taking over” the empire rather than “replacing” it. It would have been difficult for the crusaders to justify referring to the empire as "Roman" considering that Western Europe generally held the Germanic Holy Roman Empire to represent the legitimate Roman Empire.

Nevertheless, the crusaders were well aware of the fact that Constantinople was the capital of the Roman Empire and that the Greek-speaking inhabitants of the empire saw themselves as Romaioi (Romans). The full title actually used by the first Latin Emperor, Baldwin I, was Balduinus dei gratia fidelissimus in Christo imperator a Deo coronatus Romanorum moderator et semper augustus. His title is a near perfect replication of the title used by Byzantine Emperor Alexios IV Angelos, placed on the throne by the crusaders previously, in a letter (only known in its Latin version) to Pope Innocent III: fidelis in Christo imperator a Deo coronatus Romanorum moderator et semper augustus. Letters by Baldwin to Pope Innocent III give his title as imperator Constantinopolitanus, possibly altered by Papal scribes as the Pope recognized the Holy Roman Emperor as the imperator Romanorum. In his seals, Baldwin abbreviated Romanorum as Rom., conveniently leaving it open for interpretation whether he referred to Romaniae ("land of the Romans") or Romanorum ("the Romans"). It is probably more likely that he meant Romanorum. The term "Romania" had been used unofficially by the population of the Byzantine Empire for their country for centuries.

Baldwin's successor Henry used three different versions of his imperial title; Henricus Dei Gratia Imperator Romaniae ("Emperor of Romania"), Henricus Dei Gratia Imperator Romanorum ("Emperor of the Romans") and Henricus Dei Gratia Imperator Constantinopolitani ("Emperor of Constantinople"), possibly intended for different recipients. Usage of the title Emperor of Constantinople may not just have been to appease the Pope and Western Europe, but might also have been used to legitimize the rule of the Latin Emperors in regards to the Byzantines that they ruled. Possession of the city itself was a key legitimizing factor that set the Latin Emperors apart from Byzantine claimants in Nicaea, Trebizond and Thessalonica.

History

Origins 

After the fall of Constantinople in the Fourth Crusade, the crusaders agreed to divide up Byzantine territory. In the Partitio terrarum imperii Romaniae, signed on 1 October 1204, three eighths of the empire — including Crete and other islands — went to the Republic of Venice. The Latin Empire claimed the remainder and exerted control over:
 areas of Greece, divided into vassal fiefs: 
 the Kingdom of Thessalonica
 the Principality of Achaea
 the Duchy of Athens
 the Duchy of the Archipelago
 the short-lived Duchy of Philippopolis in north Thrace
Further duchies were projected in Asia Minor, at Nicaea (for Louis of Blois), Nicomedia (Thierry de Loos), Philadelphia  (Stephen du Perche), and Neokastra. These duchies remained theoretical, due to the establishment of the Empire of Nicaea in the area. Nicaea itself was never occupied and Louis of Blois was killed in 1205. Thierry de Loos was captured by the Nicaeans in 1207 and, although released, left the Latin Empire two years later. After a brief Nicaean reconquest, Nicomedia returned to Latin control, but the ducatus Nichomedie remained part of the Imperial domain.  Philadelphia never came under actual Latin control, although the Latin emperor Henry of Flanders laid claim to the region after defeating the local strongman, Theodore Mangaphas, in 1205. The duchy of Neokastra (ducatus Novi Castri) on the other hand was never accorded to a single holder, but was divided among the Knights Hospitaller (one quarter) and other feudatories. The term "duchy" in this case reflects the earlier Byzantine use of the term thema, usually governed by a doux, to designate a province.

The Doge of Venice did not rank as a vassal to the Latin Empire, but his position in control of three-eighths of its territory and of parts of Constantinople itself ensured Venice's influence in the Empire's affairs. However, much of the former Byzantine territory remained in the hands of rival successor states led by Byzantine Greek aristocrats, such as the Despotate of Epirus, the Empire of Nicaea, and the Empire of Trebizond, each bent on reconquest from the Latins.

The crowning of Baldwin I (16 May 1204) and the establishment of the Latin Empire had the curious effect of creating five simultaneously existing entities claiming to be successors of the Roman Empire: the Latin Empire, the Holy Roman Empire, and the three remnants of the Byzantine Empire, the Despotate of Epirus, the Empire of Nicaea, and the Empire of Trebizond. None of these polities actually controlled the city of Rome, which remained under the temporal authority of the Pope.

In Asia Minor 

The initial campaigns of the crusaders in Asia Minor resulted in the capture of most of Bithynia by 1205, with the defeat of the forces of Theodore I Laskaris at Poemanenum and Prusa. Latin successes continued, and in 1207 a truce was signed with Theodore, newly proclaimed Emperor of Nicaea. The Latins inflicted a further defeat on Nicaean forces at the Rhyndakos river in October 1211, and three years later the Treaty of Nymphaeum (1214) recognized their control of most of Bithynia and Mysia.

The peace was maintained until 1222, when the resurgent power of Nicaea felt sufficiently strong to challenge the Latin Empire, by that time weakened by constant warfare in its European provinces. At the battle of Poimanenon in 1224, the Latin army was defeated, and by the next year Emperor Robert of Courtenay was forced to cede all his Asian possessions to Nicaea, except for Nicomedia and the territories directly across from Constantinople. Nicaea turned also to the Aegean, capturing the islands awarded to the empire. In 1235, finally, the last Latin possessions fell to Nicaea.

In Europe 
Unlike in Asia, where the Latin Empire faced only an initially weak Nicaea, in Europe it was immediately confronted with a powerful enemy: the Bulgarian tsar Kaloyan. When Baldwin campaigned against the Byzantine lords of Thrace, they called upon Kaloyan for help. At the Battle of Adrianople on 14 April 1205, the Latin heavy cavalry and knights were crushed by Kaloyan's troops and Cuman allies, and Emperor Baldwin was captured. He was imprisoned in the Bulgarian capital Tarnovo until his death later in 1205. Kaloyan was murdered a couple of years later (1207) during a siege of Thessalonica, and the Bulgarian threat conclusively defeated with a victory the following year, which allowed Baldwin's successor, Henry of Flanders, to reclaim most of the lost territories in Thrace until 1210, when peace was concluded with the marriage of Henry to Maria of Bulgaria, tsar Kaloyan's daughter.

At the same time, another Greek successor state, the Despotate of Epirus, under Michael I Komnenos Doukas, posed a threat to the empire's vassals in Thessalonica and Athens. Henry demanded his submission, which Michael provided, giving off his daughter to Henry's brother Eustace in the summer of 1209. This alliance allowed Henry to launch a campaign in Macedonia, Thessaly and Central Greece against the rebellious Lombard lords of Thessalonica. However, Michael's attack on the Kingdom of Thessalonica in 1210 forced him to return north to relieve the city and to force Michael back into submission.

In 1214 however, Michael died, and was succeeded by Theodore Komnenos Doukas, who was determined to capture Thessalonica. On 11 June 1216, while supervising repairs to the walls of Thessalonica, Henry died, and was succeeded by Peter of Courtenay, who himself was captured and executed by Theodore the following year. A regency was set up in Constantinople, headed by Peter's widow, Yolanda of Flanders, until her death in 1219. Her son Robert of Courtenay being absent in France, the regency passed first to Conon de Béthune, and after his death shortly after, to Cardinal Giovanni Colonna, until 1221, when Robert of Courtenay arrived in Constantinople. Distracted by the renewed war with Nicaea, and waiting in vain for assistance from Pope Honorius III and the King of France Philip II, the Latin Empire was unable to prevent the final fall of Thessalonica to Epirus in 1224. Epirote armies then conquered Thrace in 1225–26, appearing before Constantinople itself. The Latin Empire was saved for a time by the threat posed to Theodore by the Bulgarian tsar Ivan II Asen, and a truce was concluded in 1228.

Decline and fall 
After Robert of Courtenay died in 1228, a new regency under John of Brienne was set up. After the disastrous Epirote defeat by the Bulgarians at the Battle of Klokotnitsa, the Epirote threat to the Latin Empire was removed, only to be replaced by Nicaea, which started acquiring territories in Greece. Emperor John III Doukas Vatatzes of Nicaea concluded an alliance with Bulgaria, which in 1235 resulted in a joint campaign against the Latin Empire, and an unsuccessful siege of Constantinople the same year. In 1237, Baldwin II attained majority and took over the reins of a much-diminished state. The empire's precarious situation forced him to travel often to Western Europe seeking aid, but largely without success. In order to raise funds, he was forced to resort to desperate means, from removing the lead roofs of the Great Palace and selling them, to handing over his only son, Philip, to Venetian merchants as a guarantee for a loan.

By 1247, the Nicaeans had effectively surrounded Constantinople, with only the city's strong walls holding them at bay, and the Battle of Pelagonia in 1259 signaled the beginning of the end of Latin predominance in Greece. Thus, on 25 July 1261, with most of the Latin troops away on campaign, the Nicaean general Alexios Strategopoulos found an unguarded entrance to the city, and entered it with 800 troops only, restoring the Byzantine Empire for his master, Michael VIII Palaiologos.

The remaining Latin states ruled territories of present-day Greece, some of them until the 18th century, and are known as Latinokratia states.

Titular claimants 
For about a century thereafter, the heirs of Baldwin II continued to use the title of Emperor of Constantinople, and were seen as the overlords of the various remaining Latin states in the Aegean. They exercised effective authority in Greece only when actually ruling as princes of Achaea, as in 1333–83.

Organization and society

Administration 
The empire was formed and administered on Western European feudal principles, incorporating some elements of the Byzantine bureaucracy. The emperor was assisted by a council, composed of the various barons, the Venetian Podestà of Constantinople and his six-member council. This council had a major voice in the governance of the realm, especially in periods of regency, when the Regent (moderator imperii) was dependent on their consent to rule. The podestà, likewise, was an extremely influential member, being practically independent of the emperor. He exercised authority over the Venetian quarters of Constantinople and Pera and the Venetian dominions within the empire, assisted by a separate set of officials. His role was more that of an ambassador and vicegerent of Venice than a vassal to the empire. The podestà was granted the title of Governor of One-Fourth and One-Half of the Empire of Romania, and was entitled to wearing the imperial crimson buskins like the emperor.

Economy 
The Latins did not trust the professional Greek bureaucracy, and in the immediate aftermath of the conquest completely dismantled the Greek economic administration of the areas they controlled.  The result was disastrous, disrupting all forms of production and trade.  Almost from its inception the Latin Empire was sending requests back to the papacy for aid.  For a few years, the major commodities it exported from the surrounding region of Thrace were wheat and furs; it also profited from Constantinople's strategic location on major trade routes.  While the empire showed some moderate vitality while Henry of Flanders was alive, after his death in 1216 there was a major deficit in leadership.  By the 1230s, Constantinople - even with its drastically reduced population - was facing a major shortage of basic foodstuffs.  In several senses, the only significant export on which the economy of the Latin Empire had any real basis was the sale of relics back to Western Europe which had been looted from Greek churches.  For example, Emperor Baldwin II sold the relic of the Crown of Thorns while in France trying to raise new funds.

Society 

The elite of the empire were the Frankish and Venetian lords, headed by the emperor, the barons and the lower-ranking vassals and liege lords, including many former Byzantine aristocrats. The bulk of the people were Orthodox Greeks, still divided according to the Byzantine system in income classes based on land ownership.

Church 

As with all Latin states, the Orthodox hierarchy was replaced by Roman Catholic prelates, but not suppressed. An expansive Catholic hierarchy was established, under the dual supervision of the Latin archbishop of Constantinople and the Papal legate, until the two offices were merged in 1231. Western Catholic religious orders, such as the Cistercians, the Dominicans and the Franciscans were established in the empire. The Orthodox clergy retained its rites and customs, including its right to marriage, but was demoted to a subordinate position, subject to the local Latin bishops.

See also
 Timeline of the Latin Empire
 Succession of the Roman Empire

Notes

References

Bibliography

External links 

The Latin Occupation in the Greek Lands - The Latin Empire, from the Foundation of the Hellenic World

 
States and territories established in 1204
States and territories disestablished in 1261
1261 disestablishments in Asia
1204 establishments in Europe
Former countries in the Balkans
Former monarchies of Europe
Former monarchies of Asia
States in medieval Anatolia
Former empires